The 1995 Malaysian motorcycle Grand Prix was the second round of the 1995 Grand Prix motorcycle racing season. It took place on 2 April 1995 at the Shah Alam Circuit.

500 cc classification

250 cc classification

125 cc classification

Notes
 The 125cc race was stopped after 12 laps and therefore only half points were given.

References

Malaysian motorcycle Grand Prix
Malaysian
Motorcycle Grand Prix